Starsky Robotics was an autonomous truck company founded in 2016. It developed trucks to drive without a person in the vehicle. The company started in 2015 and had raised $21.7 million by 2018. It failed to find further investors in November 2019, and shut down by March 2020.

History 
In 2017, Starsky Robotics announced that it had raised $5 million from Y Combinator, Sam Altman, Trucks VC, and Data Collective to create an autonomous trucking company. In 2018, company closed a $16.5 million Series A, led by Shasta Ventures.

In February 2018, Starsky Robotics completed a 7-mile fully driverless trip in Florida without a single human in the truck. Starsky is the first company to publicly test an empty cabin for autonomous trucks.

In November 2019 over 85% of staff were laid off after the company failed to find further investment, due to concerns over the financial stability of its freight-hauling arm. By March 2020 the company sold off the remaining assets, including patents relating to operating remote vehicles.

Technology 
The company developed proprietary technology that allowed drivers to remotely pilot trucks from a central headquarters. The company successfully completed full deliveries with 85% autonomy. Starsky Robotics’ system worked to solve the issue of final-mile delivery by removing drivers from the cab entirely and putting them in an office where they could remotely operate the truck from terminal to delivery.

See also
Otto
Komatsu Limited

References

External links 
 Starsky Robotics Official Site

Companies based in San Francisco
Robotics companies of the United States
2020 disestablishments in California
American companies disestablished in 2020